Somsak Chaiyarate (born 22 January 1923) is a Thai former sports shooter. He competed in the 50 metre pistol event at the 1972 Summer Olympics.

References

External links

1923 births
Possibly living people
Somsak Chaiyarate
Somsak Chaiyarate
Shooters at the 1972 Summer Olympics
Place of birth missing (living people)
Asian Games medalists in shooting
Shooters at the 1970 Asian Games
Shooters at the 1974 Asian Games
Shooters at the 1978 Asian Games
Somsak Chaiyarate
Somsak Chaiyarate
Medalists at the 1970 Asian Games
Medalists at the 1974 Asian Games
Medalists at the 1978 Asian Games
Somsak Chaiyarate